Tassnim Sheikh, also known as Tanisha Nerurkar, is an actress, primarily known for her work on television. Currently she stars in Anupamaa as Rakhi Dave.

Personal life 
Tasneem Sheik was born to a Muslim family in Jammu and Kashmir on 4 August 1980. She moved to Mumbai with her family at an early age. After taking training in Mumbai, she began her career as a support entertainer and television presenter with sequential Gharana. In 2006. Sheikh began her career with the TV show, Saturday Suspense in 1997. She married Sameer Nerurkar, a merchant Navy officer in 2006. They have a daughter named Tia, who inspired her to return to the industry after 6 years. After the marriage she change her name to Tanisha Nerurkar.

Filmography

Television

References

External links 

 
 

Living people
Indian television actresses
21st-century Indian actresses
Actresses in Hindi cinema
Converts to Hinduism from Islam
Actresses in Hindi television
Indian film actresses
Indian Hindus
Year of birth missing (living people)